Jan Blažek (born 20 March 1988) is a Czech football player who is currently plays for FC Horky nad Jizerou.

Blažek is known as a very talented as well as a somewhat controversial player, due to his conflicts with coaches and alcohol consumption. On his web site he stated his motto: Děvky, chlast a prcání (hookers, booze and fucking). The site also included many photographs of him drinking rum with cola. After Blažek's transfer to Slavia, the web site gained some attention of the media, resulting in motto being changed to věř v sám sebe (trust in yourself) and the controversial photographs were removed.

In July 2011 Blažek returned to his mother club FC Slovan Liberec. On 24 July 2012, Blažek scored a goal against Kazakhstani club Shakhter Karagandy at the very end of the period of extra time to level the result at 1–1 and enable his team to progress to the next round of the UEFA Champions League by an aggregate score of 2–1. He spent time at Greek second division side Aiginiakos in the autumn part of the 2014–15 season, before joining FK Dukla Prague on loan in February 2015.

International career 
On 15 November 2009, Blažek made his first appearance for the national team in a friendly game against United Arab Emirates.

References

External links 

1988 births
Living people
Czech footballers
Czech Republic youth international footballers
Czech Republic under-21 international footballers
Czech Republic international footballers
Czech expatriate footballers
SK Slavia Prague players
FC Slovan Liberec players
Athlitiki Enosi Larissa F.C. players
Apollon Smyrnis F.C. players
FK Dukla Prague players
Czech First League players
Super League Greece players
Expatriate footballers in Greece
Expatriate footballers in Poland
People from Trutnov
Association football forwards
Sportspeople from the Hradec Králové Region